TN 80 was deployed between 1985 and 1991 as the warhead of the ASMP air-to-surface missile carried by the Dassault Mirage IVP bomber. The yield was 300 kt, and it was hardened against nuclear defense missiles.

References
Norris, Robert, Burrows, Andrew, Fieldhouse, Richard "Nuclear Weapons Databook, Volume V, British, French and Chinese Nuclear Weapons, San Francisco, Westview Press, 1994, 

Nuclear warheads of France
Military equipment introduced in the 1980s